Rand L. Schleusener (born October 23, 1957) is a former American football offensive lineman. He played for the Nebraska Cornhuskers 1977–1980. He was selected in the 1981 NFL Draft, but never played in the NFL.

After football, he went on to become a spine surgeon with the Black Hills Orthopedic & Spine Center in Rapid City, South Dakota.

References

External links
Nebraska Cornhuskers bio

1957 births
Living people
Sportspeople from Rapid City, South Dakota
American football offensive linemen
Nebraska Cornhuskers football players
All-American college football players
Players of American football from South Dakota